Saint-Denis-Lanneray is a commune in the Eure-et-Loir department in northern France. It was established on 1 January 2019 by merger of the former communes of Saint-Denis-les-Ponts (the seat) and Lanneray.

Population

See also
Communes of the Eure-et-Loir department

References

Communes of Eure-et-Loir